Between November and December 2009, 51 tornadoes touched down across eight states. Collectively, the tornadoes injured nine people and wrought $20.36 million, much of which resulted from an EF3—the strongest tornado during the two-month period—that struck Lufkin, Texas, on December 23. Compared to annual averages, November was one of the quietest on record while December was one of the most active on record for their respective months. With only three confirmed events in November, the month ranks as the third quietest on record since 1950. The opposite is true for December, during which 45 tornadoes touched down; at the time, this was the second highest since 2000 and the sixth highest since reliable records began.

The month of November featured no tornado outbreaks while December featured two. The first spawned 7 tornadoes on December 2 and the second, more prolific event, resulted in 28 tornadoes from December 23–24. Twelve tornadoes touched down within the warning area of the National Weather Service office in Lake Charles, Louisiana—the largest such event in their jurisdiction since November 23, 2004. Both outbreaks were the result of strong extratropical cyclones that moved across the Southern United States, with tornadoes primarily developing along a cold front that extended south of the system's center or within supercells ahead of the front.

Daily statistics

November

November 6 event

November 29 event

December

December 2 event

December 8 event

December 9 event

December 14 event

December 15 event

December 18 event

December 23 event

December 24 event

See also
Tornadoes of 2009
List of North American tornadoes and tornado outbreaks

Notes

References

External links
National Climatic Data Center State of the Climate reports
National Climatic Data Center Storm Events Database

F3 tornadoes
Tornadoes of 2009
November 2009 events in the United States
December 2009 events in the United States
Lists of tornadoes in the United States by time